The 2014 Esiliiga was the 2nd season of the Esiliiga B. The season started on Friday 28 February 2014, and concluded on Sunday 9 November 2014. Infonet II Tallinn won the Esiliiga B, finishing with 99 points.

Teams

Stadiums and locations

Personnel and kits 
Note: Flags indicate national team as has been defined under FIFA eligibility rules. Players and Managers may hold more than one non-FIFA nationality.

Managerial changes

Results

League table

Promotion play-off 
HÜJK Emmaste voluntarily declined joining Esiliiga and remained in Esiliiga B.

Relegation play-offs
Ararat TTÜ Tallinn, who finished 8th, faced Joker 1993 Raasiku, the II liiga play-off winners, for a two-legged play-off. The winner on aggregate score after both matches will earn a spot in the 2015 Esiliiga B. Joker 1993 Raasiku won 7–7 on aggregate.

Season statistics

Top goalscorers 
As of 9 November 2014.

Awards

See also 
 2013–14 Estonian Cup
 2014–15 Estonian Cup
 2014 Meistriliiga
 2014 Esiliiga

References 

Esiliiga B seasons
3
Estonia
Estonia